Late Nights and Longnecks is the fifth studio album by American country music singer Justin Moore. It was released on July 26, 2019 via Valory Music Group, an imprint of Big Machine Records. It includes the singles "The Ones That Didn't Make It Back Home" and "Why We Drink". It is the first album in which Moore co-wrote all of the songs.

Promotion
"The Ones That Didn't Make It Back Home" was released as the lead single from the album on October 12, 2018, and it became Moore's seventh Number One hit on the Billboard Country Airplay chart for the week dated September 6, 2019.

Moore revealed the cover art and track listing on February 22, 2019, and released "Jesus and Jack Daniels" as a promotional single on March 8, 2019. "Why We Drink" was released on September 30, 2019, as the album's second single to country radio.

Commercial performance
The album debuted at No. 2 on the Top Country Albums chart with 19,000 units, 14,000 of which are traditional album sales. The album has sold 36,400 copies in the United States as of March 2020.

Track listing

Personnel
Adapted from AllMusic

Sarah Buxton - background vocals
Paul DiGiovanni - acoustic guitar, keyboards, programming
Paul Franklin - steel guitar
Evan Hutchings - drums
Brent Mason - electric guitar
Justin Moore - lead vocals
Jason Kyle Saetviet - background vocals
Jimmie Lee Sloas - bass guitar
Ilya Toshinsky - dobro, acoustic guitar
Will Weatherly - keyboards
Derek Wells - electric guitar

Charts

Weekly charts

Year-end charts

References

2019 albums
Justin Moore albums
Big Machine Records albums
Albums produced by Jeremy Stover